The Steinalm Formation is a geologic formation in the Northern Limestone Alps, in Austria.

It is a sub−unit of the Wetterstein limestone formation, found in the Limestone Alps.

It preserves fossils dating back to the Triassic period of the Mesozoic Era.

See also

 List of fossiliferous stratigraphic units in Austria

References
 

Triassic Austria
Geology of the Alps
Limestone Alps
Northern Limestone Alps
Geologic formations of Austria